Remapping the Human Soul is the fourth studio album by South Korean hip hop trio Epik High. It was released through Woollim Entertainment and CJ Music on January 23, 2007, and contains 27 tracks on two CDs. The singles "Fan" and "Love Love Love" were promoted as part of the album.

The album was a commercial success in South Korea, peaking at number one on the monthly RIAK album chart for two consecutive months. It was the 3rd best-selling album of 2007 with over 120,000 copies sold. It went on to win awards such as Album of the Year at the 2007 Mnet Asian Music Awards, Best Album at the 2007 Seoul Music Awards, and Best Hip Hop Album at the 2008 Korean Music Awards.

Background 
Following the popularity of the single "Fly" from their 2005 album, Swan Songs, Epik High spent a year and a half writing over 200 new songs. The group ultimately recorded 47 of those songs and selected 27 to include on Remapping the Human Soul. Due to the album's controversial subject matter covering topics including sex, religion, and war, the album had its sales age-restricted, and some of its songs were banned from being played on South Korean radio stations.

Composition 
Part 2 (The Heart), which was produced by Tablo, is influenced by Philip Glass, Billy Corgan, Timbaland. He also has emphasised his interest in rock, jazz, trance, garage, as well as hip hop. Various tracks contain samples of other songs, including "The End Times (Opening)" with "真実の爆弾(Shinjitsu no bakudan)" by King Giddra, "White Night" with "Nothing Can Stop Me" by Marilyn McCoo and Billy Davis Jr., "Mr. Doctor" with "Hasta Siempre" by Soledad Bravo, "Nocturne (Tablo's Word)" with "Once Upon a Time" by Donna Summer, "중독" with "Flashback" by Dee Dee Sharp, and "Broken Toys" with "Half Forgotten Daydreams" by John Cameron.

Accolades

Track listing 
Track listing and credits adapted from Naver Music, Google Play, and the Korea Music Copyright Association.

Charts and sales

Monthly charts

Year-end charts

Sales

References

External links
Epik High official website

2007 albums
Epik High albums
Woollim Entertainment albums